Sue May Gailey Wescott Gill was an American artist and member of the Philadelphia Ten.

Life
Sue May Gill was born on January 12, 1887, in Sabinal, Texas. The second child of Asa Jones Gailey and Sue Louise Connally, she studied at the Chicago Art Institute, the Pennsylvania Academy of the Fine Arts and the Academie Colarossi in Paris. Gill married Orville D. Wescott, a physician residing in Denver, Colorado in 1908, and had a daughter in 1915. She and Wescott divorced in 1928, and she later married Paul L. Gill, with whom she lived in Harvey Cedars, New Jersey.

Gill had a one-woman show at the Art Club of Philadelphia in 1930.  In 1931 she joined the Philadelphia Ten group and served as its chairman from  1934 through 1935.

Gill died on January 14, 1989, in Topton, Pennsylvania.

References

1887 births
1989 deaths
American women painters
20th-century American painters
School of the Art Institute of Chicago alumni
Pennsylvania Academy of the Fine Arts alumni
Académie Colarossi alumni
People from Harvey Cedars, New Jersey
People from Sabinal, Texas
Painters from Texas
20th-century American women artists